Shigeru Kurihara (born 7 April 1970) is a Japanese gymnast. He competed at the 1996 Summer Olympics.

References

External links
 

1970 births
Living people
Japanese male artistic gymnasts
Olympic gymnasts of Japan
Gymnasts at the 1996 Summer Olympics
Sportspeople from Saitama Prefecture
20th-century Japanese people